Kerrik may refer to:
 Kerrik, Illinois
 Kerrik, Iran